"Come Over" is a song written by Sam Hunt, Shane McAnally, and Josh Osborne and recorded by American country music singer Kenny Chesney. It was released in May 2012 as the second single from Chesney's 2012 album Welcome to the Fishbowl.

Content
The song is set in the key of D major with a main chord pattern of Bm7–Gsus2–D/F-Dsus-D–A.

Co-writer Josh Osborne said that when writing the song, he and the co-writers were composing melodies when co-writer Sam Hunt suggested to make it a "kind of desperate thing, like the guy is pleading with this girl to come over." Upon reaching the chorus, they decided to repeat the phrase "come over" five times to "[get] into the emotion of the situation."

Critical reception
Billy Dukes of Taste of Country gave the song three and a half stars out of five, writing that "the songwriters show power in efficiency, yet the singer never really conveys the physical need for this woman that the repetition begs for." Matt Bjorke of Roughstock gave the song four stars out of five, saying that it "shows off a completely different side for Kenny Chesney and it manages to feel immediate and current in ways that 'Feel Like a Rock Star' didn't."

Music video
The music video was directed by Shaun Silva and premiered in June 2012. The music video alternates between scenes featuring Chesney and scenes featuring Courtney McCann.  It was filmed in Fort Lauderdale, Florida with some ocean scenes near Miami Beach, Florida. Chesney has described the music video as a "classy booty call." It is entirely in black-and-white, and features a cameo from his dog, Poncho, standing on a paddleboard alongside Chesney.

Chart performance
"Come Over" debuted at number 24 on the U.S. Billboard Hot Country Songs chart for the week of June 2, 2012. After spending eleven weeks on the Hot Country Songs chart, "Come Over" became Chesney's twenty-second number one single for the week of August 11, 2012. The song has sold over a million copies in the US.

Year-end charts

Certifications

Other versions
Co-writer Sam Hunt recorded a version of "Come Over" for his acoustic mixtape Between the Pines (2013). This recording entered the Billboard Hot Country Songs chart at number 42 following the mixtape's 2015 re-release on MCA Nashville. As of November 2015, Hunt's version has sold 14,000 units.

References

2012 singles
Country ballads
2010s ballads
Kenny Chesney songs
Sam Hunt songs
Songs written by Shane McAnally
Song recordings produced by Buddy Cannon
Music videos directed by Shaun Silva
Columbia Nashville Records singles
Songs written by Sam Hunt
Songs written by Josh Osborne
Black-and-white music videos
2012 songs
Songs containing the I–V-vi-IV progression